This is a list of 106 species in Deltochilum, a genus of dung beetles in the family Scarabaeidae.

Deltochilum species

 Deltochilum abdominalis Martinez, 1947 c g
 Deltochilum acanthus Kohlmann & Solís, 2012 c g
 Deltochilum acropyge Bates, 1887 c g
 Deltochilum aequinoctiale (Buquet, 1844) c g
 Deltochilum alpercata Silva, Louzada & Vaz-de-Mello, 2015 c g
 Deltochilum amandaarcanjoae Silva, Louzada & Vaz-de-Mello, 2015 c g
 Deltochilum arturoi Silva, Louzada & Vaz-de-Mello, 2015 c g
 Deltochilum aspericolle Bates, 1870 c g
 Deltochilum aureopilosum Paulian, 1939 c g
 Deltochilum barbipes Bates, 1870 c g
 Deltochilum batesi Paulian, 1938 c g
 Deltochilum bezdeki González-Alvarado & Vaz-de-Mello, 2014 c g
 Deltochilum bordoni Halffter & Martinez, 1976 c g
 Deltochilum brasiliense (Castelnau, 1840) c g
 Deltochilum calcaratum Bates, 1870 c g
 Deltochilum cangalha Silva, Louzada & Vaz-de-Mello, 2015 c g
 Deltochilum carinatum (Westwood, 1837) c g
 Deltochilum carrilloi González-Alvarado & Vaz-de-Mello, 2014 c g
 Deltochilum costalimai Pereira & D'Andretta, 1955 c g
 Deltochilum crenulipes Paulian, 1938 c g
 Deltochilum cristatum Paulian, 1938 c g
 Deltochilum cristinae Martinez, 1991 c g
 Deltochilum cupreicolle (Blanchard, 1846) c g
 Deltochilum dentipes Eschscholtz, 1822 c g
 Deltochilum diringshofeni Pereira & Martinez, 1956 c g
 Deltochilum elevatum (Castelnau, 1840) c g
 Deltochilum elongatum Felsche, 1907 c g
 Deltochilum enceladus Kolbe, 1893 c g
 Deltochilum erodioides Harold, 1867 c g
 Deltochilum eurymedon Génier, 2012 c g
 Deltochilum feeri Silva, Louzada & Vaz-de-Mello, 2015 c g
 Deltochilum femorale Bates, 1870 c g
 Deltochilum finestriatum Silva, Louzada & Vaz-de-Mello, 2015 c g
 Deltochilum furcatum (Castelnau, 1840) c g
 Deltochilum fuscocupreum Bates, 1870 c g
 Deltochilum gibbosum (Fabricius, 1775) i c g b  (humpback dung beetle)
 Deltochilum gigante Silva & Vaz-de-Mello, 2014 c g
 Deltochilum granulatum Bates, 1870 c g
 Deltochilum granulosum Paulian, 1933 c g
 Deltochilum guildingii (Westwood, 1835) c g
 Deltochilum guyanense Paulian, 1933 c g
 Deltochilum howdeni Martinez, 1955 c g
 Deltochilum hypponum (Buquet, 1844) c g
 Deltochilum icariforme Paulian, 1938 c g
 Deltochilum icaroides Balthasar, 1939 c g
 Deltochilum icarus (Olivier, 1789) c g
 Deltochilum inaequale Balthasar, 1939 c g
 Deltochilum irroratum (Castelnau, 1840) c g
 Deltochilum kolbei Paulian, 1938 c g
 Deltochilum kolleri Silva, Louzada & Vaz-de-Mello, 2015 c g
 Deltochilum komareki Balthasar, 1939 c g
 Deltochilum laetiusculum Bates, 1870 c g
 Deltochilum larseni Silva, Louzada & Vaz-de-Mello, 2015 c g
 Deltochilum lindemannae Balthasar, 1967 c g
 Deltochilum lobipes Bates, 1887 c g
 Deltochilum longiceps Paulian, 1938 c g
 Deltochilum loperae González & Molano, 2010 c g
 Deltochilum louzadai González-Alvarado & Vaz-de-Mello, 2014 c g
 Deltochilum luederwaldti Pereira & D'Andretta, 1955 c g
 Deltochilum mexicanum Burmeister, 1848 c g
 Deltochilum molanoi González-Alvarado & Vaz-de-Mello, 2014 c g
 Deltochilum morbillosum Burmeister, 1848 c g
 Deltochilum mourei Pereira, 1949 c g
 Deltochilum multicolor Balthasar, 1939 c g
 Deltochilum orbiculare Lansberge, 1874 c g
 Deltochilum orbignyi (Blanchard, 1846) c g
 Deltochilum panamensis Howden, 1966 c g
 Deltochilum paresi Silva, Louzada & Vaz-de-Mello, 2015 c g
 Deltochilum parile Bates, 1887 c g
 Deltochilum peruanum Paulian, 1938 c g
 Deltochilum plebejum Balthasar, 1939 c g
 Deltochilum pretiosum Harold, 1875 c g
 Deltochilum pseudoicarus Balthasar, 1939 c g
 Deltochilum pseudoparile Paulian, 1938 c g
 Deltochilum punctatum Harold, 1880 c g
 Deltochilum riehli Harold, 1868 c g
 Deltochilum ritamourae Silva, Louzada & Vaz-de-Mello, 2015 c g
 Deltochilum robustus Molano & González, 2010 c g
 Deltochilum rosamariae Martinez, 1991 c g
 Deltochilum rubripenne (Gory, 1831) c g
 Deltochilum scabriusculum Bates, 1887 i c g b
 Deltochilum schefflerorum Silva, Louzada & Vaz-de-Mello, 2015 c g
 Deltochilum sculpturatum Felsche, 1907 c g
 Deltochilum septemstriatum Paulian, 1938 c g
 Deltochilum sericeum Paulian, 1938 c g
 Deltochilum sextuberculatum Bates, 1870 c g
 Deltochilum silphoides Balthasar, 1939 c g
 Deltochilum speciosissimum Balthasar, 1939 c g
 Deltochilum spinipes Paulian, 1938 c g
 Deltochilum streblopodum Silva, Louzada & Vaz-de-Mello, 2015 c g
 Deltochilum sublaeve Bates, 1887 c g
 Deltochilum submetallicum (Castelnau, 1840) c g
 Deltochilum subrubrum  g
 Deltochilum subrubum Silva, Louzada & Vaz-de-Mello, 2015 c g
 Deltochilum tessellatum Bates, 1870 c g
 Deltochilum titovidaurrei Silva, Louzada & Vaz-de-Mello, 2015 c g
 Deltochilum trisignatum Harold, 1880 c g
 Deltochilum tumidum Howden, 1966 i c g
 Deltochilum valgum Burmeister, 1873 c g
 Deltochilum variolosum Burmeister, 1873 c g
 Deltochilum verruciferum Felsche, 1911 c g
 Deltochilum violaceum Paulian, 1938 c g
 Deltochilum violetae Martinez, 1991 c g
 Deltochilum viridescens Martinez, 1948 c g
 Deltochilum viridicatum Silva, Louzada & Vaz-de-Mello, 2015 c g
 Deltochilum viridicupreum Balthasar, 1939 c g

Data sources: i = ITIS, c = Catalogue of Life, g = GBIF, b = Bugguide.net

References

Deltochilum